Estádio João Cardoso is a football stadium in Tondela, Portugal, with a capacity for 5,000 spectators. It is the home stadium of C.D. Tondela, currently playing in the Portuguese Primeira Liga.

The stadium, built in 2008, initially held a capacity of 2,674 spectators but following Tondela's promotion to the top division in 2015, the club upgraded the facility by building two new stands, bringing the capacity up to 5,000. The newly expanded stadium was inaugurated on 13 December 2015.

The stadium hosted the 2015-16 Taça AF Viseu final.

On 11 March 2017, there were 4.987 spectators in the match against Sporting CP, a new record for the stadium.

Portugal national football team
The following national team matches were held in the stadium.

References

Joao Cardoso
Buildings and structures in Viseu District
C.D. Tondela
Sports venues completed in 2008